Willowbank Raceway is a drag racing facility located off the Cunningham Highway, Willowbank, City of Ipswich, Queensland, Australia. It is located approximately 30 – 45 minutes drive west of Brisbane. It is part of the Ipswich Motorsport Precinct, which includes a kart racing track; Ipswich Sprint Racing Circuit, a short circuit dirt racetrack; Ipswich Motor Sport Complex and bitumen racetrack Queensland Raceway. Since the closing of Surfers Paradise International Raceway following the 1987 Winternationals, the popular event, one of the largest drag racing festivals in the southern hemisphere, moved to the circuit in 1988. Between the end of Calder Park Raceway's top level drag racing career and the opening of Western Sydney International Dragway, it also hosted the Australian Drag Racing Nationals.

The circuit in 2015 defected from the national governing body of the sport, the Australian National Drag Racing Association by joining West Palm Beach, Florida (USA) based International Hot Rod Association sanctioning body.  It is one of three (Sydney Dragway and newly built Springmount Raceway the others) currently affiliated with IHRA and not ANDRA.

References

External links
 Official website

Drag racing venues in Australasia
Motorsport venues in Queensland
City of Ipswich
Sport in Ipswich, Queensland